Lenas Limassol is a Cypriot association football club based in Agios Ioannis area of Limassol. It has 2 participations in Cypriot Fourth Division.

References

Football clubs in Cyprus
Association football clubs established in 1961
1961 establishments in Cyprus